LLM Pieter Claude Bijleveld (Nijmegen, August 28, 1828 – Nijmegen, September 2, 1898) was a Dutch politician.

Life and work 
Bijleveld was a son of Nijmegen mayor François Pierre Bijleveld and Reiniera Charlotte Rau. He studied law. In 1856 he was appointed mayor of Zaltbommel and in 1875 he succeeded his father as mayor of Nijmegen, a function he held until his death in 1898. Bijleveld was Officier in de Orde van Oranje-Nassau.

Bijleveld married on 4 juni 1857 with Gosuina Alida Rudolphina Ketjen, a daughter of Jan Hendrik Ketjen and Adriana Sophia baroness Van Randwijck. Pieter Bijleveld was a scion of the Dutch patrician family Bijleveld.

Streetname 
A proposal, in 1896, to name a street for his father, during his mayoralty, was rejected by the council of Nijmegen. The street Bijleveldsingel is probably named after Pieter Claude Bijleveld himself.

References and sources 
 This article is a translation of Pieter Claude Bijleveld from nl.wikipedia
 Streetnames

1828 births
1898 deaths
Mayors of Nijmegen
Mayors in Gelderland
People from Zaltbommel
Officers of the Order of Orange-Nassau
People from Nijmegen